The 50th Filmfare Awards South ceremony honouring the winners and nominees of the best of South Indian cinema in films released 2002, is an event that was held at the Gachibowli Indoor Stadium, Hyderabad,  24 May 2003. The awards were distributed at Hyderabad.

Main awards
Winners are listed first, highlighted in boldface.

Kannada cinema

Malayalam cinema

Tamil cinema

Telugu cinema

Technical Awards

Special awards

Awards Presentation

 Nithiin (Best Debut Award) Received Award from Namitha
 Shafi (Best Villain Award) Received Award from Ravi Teja
 Kalabhavan Mani (Best Villain Award) Received Award from Suriya
 Vivek (Best Comedian Award) Received Award from Kiran Rathod
 Sangeeta (Best Supporting Actress Award) Received Award from Jayanth C. Paranjee
 Sneha (Best Supporting Actress Award) Received Award from Aniruddha Jatkar
 Soundarya (Best Film Kannada) Received Award from D. Ramanaidu
 D Udhaya Kumar(Best Film Tamil) Received Award from Prabhu Deva
 Girish Kasaravalli (Best Director Kannada) Received Award from Uday Kiran
 Krishna Vamsi (Best Director Telugu) Received Award from Sunil Shetty
 Gurukiran (Best Music Director Kannada) Received Award from Sachiin J. Joshi
 Bharadwaj (Best Music Director Tamil) Received Award from Nagendra Babu
 Soundarya (Best Actress Kannada) Received Award from R. Sarathkumar
 Navya Nair (Best Actress Malayalam) Received Award from Khushbu
 Sadha (Best Actress Telugu) Received Award from Venkatesh Daggubati
 Sudeep (Best Actor Kannada) Received Award from Naghma
 Dileep (Best Actor Malayalam) Received Award from Ramya Krishnan
 Chiranjeevi father (Best Actor Telugu) Receive Chiranjeevi Award from K. Raghavendra Rao
 K. Raghavendra Rao (Lifetime Achievement Award) Received Award from Jeetendra and Jaya Prada
 Vishnuvardhan (Lifetime Achievement Award) Received Award from Jeetendra and Jaya Prada

General
 50th Manikchand Filmfare Awards

References

External links
 
 

Filmfare Awards South